A grilled cheese (sometimes known as a toasted sandwich or cheese toastie) is a hot sandwich typically prepared by heating one or more slices of cheese between slices of bread, with a cooking fat such as butter or mayonnaise on a frying pan, griddle, or sandwich toaster, until the bread browns and the cheese melts.

History
The cheese dream, an open-faced grilled cheese sandwich, became popular in the U.S. during the Great Depression. U.S. government cookbooks describe Navy cooks broiling "American cheese filling sandwiches" during World War II.

Preparation 

A grilled cheese sandwich is made by placing a cheese filling, often cheddar or American cheese, between two slices of bread, which is then heated until the bread browns and the cheese melts.  A layer of butter or mayonnaise may be added to the outside of the bread for additional flavor and texture. Alternatives may include additional ingredients, such as meat, peppers, tomatoes, or onions. Methods for heating the sandwich include cooking on a griddle, fried in a pan, or using a panini grill or sandwich toaster, the latter method more common in the United Kingdom, where the sandwiches are normally called "toasted sandwiches" or "toasties", in Australia, where they are called "jaffles" or "toasted sandwiches", and South Africa, where they are called “snackwiches”. Other methods include baking in an oven or toaster oven — or in a toasting bag in an electric toaster.

The sandwich is typically served as a snack or lunchtime meal, often with a side of salad, soup, french fries, or other accompaniment.

Retail
Some restaurants, food carts and food trucks in the United States specialize in the grilled cheese sandwich. The Grilled Cheese Grill restaurants were a combination of reclaimed vehicle and food cart restaurants that focus on gourmet grilled cheese sandwiches in Portland, Oregon. The Grilled Cheese Truck is an American food truck company serving gourmet "chef driven" grilled cheese sandwiches. The company started in Los Angeles, California, in 2009, and has since expanded throughout Southern California, Phoenix, San Antonio and Austin. The American Grilled Cheese Kitchen is a restaurant in San Francisco, California that specializes in the sandwich.

Microwavable frozen toasted sandwiches are available in supermarkets in a variety of locations. One of the earliest examples might be the McCain Micro Toastie, which was launched in supermarkets in the UK in 2002.

See also 

 Cheese sandwich
 Bruschetta
 Carrozza (sandwich)
 Cheese dream
 Cheese melt
 Cheese on toast
 Comfort food
 Croque-monsieur
 Fried cheese
 Khachapuri
 List of sandwiches
 Panini
 Patty melt
 Pie iron
 Quesadilla
 Reuben sandwich
 Welsh rarebit

References 

American sandwiches
British sandwiches
Cheese sandwiches
Types of food
World cuisine